John IV served as Greek Patriarch of Alexandria between 569 and 579.

References

6th-century Patriarchs of Alexandria
Coptic Orthodox saints